Princess Komala Saovabha or Phra Chao Boromwongse Ther Phra Ong Chao Komala Saovamala (RTGS: Komon Saowaman) (19 September 1887 – 19 April 1890), was the Princess of Siam (later Thailand). She was a member of the Siamese Royal Family. She was a daughter of Chulalongkorn, King Rama V of Siam and Chao Chom Manda Wong.

She died in her babyhood on 19 April 1890, at the age of only 2 years and 7 months.

Ancestry

1887 births
1890 deaths
19th-century Thai royalty who died as children
19th-century Chakri dynasty
Thai female Phra Ong Chao
Children of Chulalongkorn
Daughters of kings